Black Sin is a 1989 German-French short drama film directed by Danièle Huillet and Jean-Marie Straub. It was screened in the Un Certain Regard section at the 1989 Cannes Film Festival.

The text presented in the film is the third Empedocles fragment by Friedrich Hölderlin. The two statues shown at the beginning are Mother Earth and The Avenger by Ernst Barlach. The music is the fourth movement of Ludwig van Beethoven's String Quartet No. 16 in F major Op. 135, the last work he was able to complete before his death. The fourth movement is entitled The difficult decision. The string quartet was recorded in London in 1935 by the Busch Quartet, who fled Nazi Germany to England in 1934.

Cast
 Andreas von Rauch as Empédocle
 Vladimir Baratta as Pausanias
 Howard Vernon as Manes
 Danièle Huillet

References

External links

1989 films
1989 short films
French drama short films
German drama short films
1980s avant-garde and experimental films
French avant-garde and experimental films
German avant-garde and experimental films
West German films
1980s German-language films
Films directed by Jean-Marie Straub and Danièle Huillet
Friedrich Hölderlin
1980s German films
1980s French films